Mountain aster is a common name for several plants in the aster family and may refer to:

Canadanthus
Eurybia chlorolepis, native to the southeastern United States